Cryptoblepharus eximius is a species of lizard in the family Scincidae. It is endemic to Fiji.

References

Cryptoblepharus
Reptiles described in 1858
Endemic fauna of Fiji
Taxa named by Charles Frédéric Girard
Reptiles of Fiji